Ayvacık Dam is a dam in Çanakkale Province, Turkey, built between 1997 and 2007.

See also
List of dams and reservoirs in Turkey

External links
DSI

Dams in Çanakkale Province
Dams completed in 2007